Pierre Billiou (c.1632 – c.1708) was a French Huguenot born in Flanders. He was a founder of Old Town in 1661, one of the first permanent settlements on Staten Island, shortly before the Dutch colony of New Netherland became the British Province of New York. The Dutch Colonial home whose construction Billiou began in the 1660s, now known as the Billiou–Stillwell–Perine House, is landmarked as the oldest existing building on Staten Island and one of the oldest buildings in the United States. His family still lives under the modern name Bilyeu and lives in Tennessee.

References 

Huguenots
1632 births
1702 deaths
Walloon people
People from Staten Island
People of New Netherland